The chestnut clearwing moth (Coptotriche perplexa) was a species of moth in the family Tischeriidae. It was endemic to the United States. It is characterized by clear wings and a dark and metallic blue abdomen seemingly wrapped in a yellow band of color. By 1996 it had become extinct due to chestnut blight obliterating its primary food source, the American chestnut.

Sources

Tischeriidae
Extinct moths
Endemic fauna of the United States
Moths described in 1972
Extinct insects since 1500
Taxonomy articles created by Polbot
Taxobox binomials not recognized by IUCN